David Walters (born September 27, 1987), also known as Dave Walters, is an American former competition swimmer, Olympic gold medalist, and world record-holder in the 4x200 meter freestyler relay.  At the 2008 Summer Olympics, Walters earned a gold medal by swimming in the heats of the 4×200-meter freestyle relay. As part of the American team, he also formerly held the world record in the 4×100-meter medley relay (long course).  Walters is also a seven-time medalist (five gold, one silver, one bronze) at the World Aquatics Championships.

Early years and education 

Walters was born in Newport News, Virginia.  He graduated from Tabb High School in Yorktown, Virginia, where he competed for the Tabb Tigers high school swim team.  He received an athletic scholarship to attend the University of Texas in Austin, Texas, where he swam for coach Eddie Reese's Texas Longhorns swimming and diving team in National Collegiate Athletic Association (NCAA) and Big 12 Conference competition from 2007 to 2010.  He was a four-time Big 12 champion, a six-time All-American, and won the individual NCAA national championship in the 200-yard freestyle in 2008.  At the conclusion of his 2009–10 senior year, the Longhorns won the NCAA national team championship.

International competition

2008 Summer Olympics

Walters swam the first leg of the 4×200meter freestyle relay preliminaries (in 1:46.57) with Ricky Berens, Erik Vendt, and Klete Keller. Their time of 7:04.66 broke the previous Olympic record of 7:07.05 set by Australia in 2000. In the final of the 4×200-meter freestyle relay, Michael Phelps, Ryan Lochte, Berens and Peter Vanderkaay swam a combined time of 6:58.56, a new world record.

2009 World Championships

At the 2009 National Championships, Walters competed in three events.  In his first event, the 200-meter freestyle, Walters placed second to Michael Phelps with a time of 1:44.95. In the 100-meter freestyle, Walters placed second to Nathan Adrian in a time of 48.17. In the 50-meter freestyle, Walters placed 15th in the heats with a time of 22.60.

At the 2009 World Aquatics Championships in Rome, Walters earned a gold medal as a member of the 4×200-meter freestyle relay.  Walters, with Michael Phelps, Ricky Berens and Ryan Lochte, swam a combined time of 6:58.55 to break the world record set last year in Beijing. In the 100-meter freestyle final, Walters placed 5th with a time of 47.33 to break Michael Phelps' American record of 47.51. Walters placed 12th overall in the 200-meter freestyle and did not advance to the final. In the 4×100-meter medley relay final, Walters, with Aaron Peirsol, Michael Phelps, and Eric Shanteau, swam a combined time of 3:27.28 to break the world record set last year in Beijing.

Personal bests
.

Key:  NR = National record

See also
 List of Olympic medalists in swimming (men)
 List of University of Texas at Austin alumni
 List of World Aquatics Championships medalists in swimming (men)
 World record progression 4 × 100 metres medley relay
 World record progression 4 × 200 metres freestyle relay

References

External links
 
 
 
 
 
 
 

1987 births
Living people
American male freestyle swimmers
Olympic gold medalists for the United States in swimming
Swimmers at the 2008 Summer Olympics
Texas Longhorns men's swimmers
World Aquatics Championships medalists in swimming
World record holders in swimming
Medalists at the 2008 Summer Olympics
Sportspeople from Newport News, Virginia
Tabb High School alumni